The Fake is a 1924 play by the British writer Frederick Lonsdale. It was staged at the Apollo Theatre in the West End with a cast that included Godfrey Tearle, Franklyn Bellamy and Allan Jeayes. Unlike most of his successful plays, generally farce-like comedies, this was intended as a serious drama although it contains a happy ending. It ran for 211 performances.

When the play transferred to  Broadway, Claudette Colbert was originally cast as the female lead, but was replaced by Frieda Inescort.

Film adaptation
In 1927 it was turned into a British silent film The Fake directed by Georg Jacoby and starring Henry Edwards, Elga Brink, Juliette Compton and Miles Mander.

References

Bibliography
 Dick, Bernard F. Claudette Colbert: She Walked in Beauty. University Press of Mississippi, 2008.
 Donaldson, Frances. Freddy Lonsdale. Bloomsbury Publishing,  2011.

Plays by Frederick Lonsdale
1924 plays
British plays adapted into films
Plays set in London
West End plays